Moin Uddin Sarkar is a Bangladeshi politician. He was elected a member of parliament for Rangpur-7 in the 1979 Bangladeshi general election for the Bangladesh Nationalist Party.

Career 
Moin Uddin Sarkar was elected a member of parliament for constituency Rangpur-7 as a Bangladesh Nationalist Party candidate in the 1979 Bangladeshi general election.

References 

Living people
Year of birth missing (living people)
Bangladesh Nationalist Party politicians
2nd Jatiya Sangsad members